Life Sentence (stylized onscreen as L!fe Sentence) is an American comedy-drama television series, created by Erin Cardillo and Richard Keith, which debuted on The CW as a midseason entry during the 2017–18 television season. The series premiered on March 7, 2018, and concluded on June 15, 2018, with a total of 13 episodes.

On May 8, 2018, The CW cancelled Life Sentence after one season.

Premise
When Stella Abbott finds out her terminal cancer is cured, she is going to have to learn to live with all the choices she made when she decided to "live like she was dying". As she adjusts to her post-cancer world, she learns how her husband and family must also deal with the self-destructive choices they made to help Stella enjoy what they thought were her final years.

Cast and characters

Main
 Lucy Hale as Stella Abbott
 Elliot Knight as Wes Charles
 Jayson Blair as Aiden Abbott
 Brooke Lyons as Elizabeth Abbott Rojas
 Carlos PenaVega as Diego Rojas
 Gillian Vigman as Ida Abbott
 Dylan Walsh as Peter Abbott
 Nadej Bailey as Sadie

Recurring
 Anna Enger as Helena Chang, Stella's doctor. 
 Claudia Rocafort as Poppy, Ida's ex-girlfriend and Stella's godmother. 
 Dominique Lucky Martell as Fiona Abbott Rojas, Elizabeth and Diego's daughter. 
 Noor Anna Maher played the role in the pilot episode.
 Sebastian Vargas as Frank Abbott Rojas, Elizabeth and Diego's son. 
 Emanuel Eaton played the role in the pilot episode.
 Alyshia Ochse as Marlene 
 Shannon Chan-Kent as Finley, Stella's cynical boss at the coffee shop  
 Lindsey Maxwell as Denise 
 Riley Smith as Dr. Will Grant, an oncologist with a soft spot for his patients. 
 Bre Blair as Lauren 
 Rana Roy as Pippa, Wes' ex-fiancée. 
 Alyssa Diaz as Kayla, Aiden's friend and coworker. 
 Valerie Cruz as Gina, Diego's boss and Peter's love interest.

Episodes
</onlyinclude>

Production
The series was created by Erin Cardillo and Richard Keith for The CW as a midseason entry during the 2017–18 television season. They are also executive producers on the series along with Oliver Goldstick, Bill Lawrence, Jeff Ingold, and director Lee Toland Krieger. The show is produced by In Good Company, Doozer Productions, CBS Television Studios and Warner Bros. Television and filmed in Vancouver, British Columbia, Canada. The series is set in the fictional town of Asheville, Oregon.

The CW officially ordered Life Sentence to series on May 10, 2017. In January 2018, the network announced the premiere date of Life Sentence on March 7, 2018.

On March 30, 2018, The CW announced that Life Sentence would move to Fridays at 9:00 pm, which began with the sixth episode.

Casting
In late January 2017, Lucy Hale was cast as Stella Abbott, followed in February by the casting of Jayson Blair as her older brother, Aiden, and Dylan Walsh as her father, Peter. On February 24, 2017, Gillian Vigman and Brooke Lyons were cast as Ida and Elizabeth, Abbott's mother and sister, respectively. During March 2017, it was announced that Elliot Knight and Carlos PenaVega had joined the cast as Wes, Abbott's husband, and Diego, her brother-in-law, respectively. During September 2017, Riley Smith was cast in the recurring role of Dr. Will Grant, a rough-around-the-edges oncologist with a secret soft spot for his patients.

Filming
Production on the pilot took place from March 15 to March 31, 2017, in Atlanta, Georgia. Filming moved to Vancouver, British Columbia after being picked up to series. Production began on August 9, 2017, and concluded on January 12, 2018.

Reception

Critical response
On review aggregator website Rotten Tomatoes, the series holds an approval rating of 37% based on 19 reviews, and an average rating of 4.47/10. Its critical consensus reads, "Life Sentence avoids asking tough questions about serious issues, settling instead for a cloying sweetness." On Metacritic, which assigns normalized rating to reviews, the series has a weighted average score of 49 out of 100, based on 12 critics, indicating "mixed or average reviews".

Ratings

References

External links

2018 American television series debuts
2018 American television series endings
2010s American comedy-drama television series
2010s American LGBT-related comedy television series
2010s American LGBT-related drama television series
The CW original programming
Television series about cancer
Television series by CBS Studios
Television series by Warner Bros. Television Studios
Television shows filmed in Atlanta
Television shows filmed in Vancouver